Mo=Da=Mu was a Canadian independent record label founded in 1980 in Vancouver, British Columbia.  The music label was established by Allen Moy of the punk rock band Popular Front, and released material by bands such as 54-40, Bolero Lava, Moral Lepers, Animal Slaves, Doomsday Army, Rhythm Mission, and The Work Party.

By 1983, 54-40 were the only profitable act on the label, so Moy and business partner Keith Porteous folded the label in 1987 and instead became 54-40's management team.

See also

 List of record labels

References

Record labels established in 1980
Record labels disestablished in 1987
Canadian independent record labels
Indie rock record labels
Alternative rock record labels
Companies based in Vancouver
Defunct record labels of Canada